Elena Yuryevna Azarova (June 5, 1973 in Moscow, USSR) is a Russian synchronized swimmer.

She has two won Olympic gold medals (2000, 2004), and a winner of World (1998) and European Championships (1991, 1993, 1995, 1997, 1999, 2000), World Cups and other tournaments.

She is a member of National team since 1989 and retirement in 2004, and now she is media relations manager of Special Olympics.

External links
 Yelena Azarova 

Russian synchronized swimmers
Olympic synchronized swimmers of Russia
Synchronized swimmers at the 1996 Summer Olympics
Synchronized swimmers at the 2000 Summer Olympics
Synchronized swimmers at the 2004 Summer Olympics
Olympic gold medalists for Russia
1973 births
Living people
Swimmers from Moscow
Olympic medalists in synchronized swimming
Medalists at the 2004 Summer Olympics
Lesgaft National State University of Physical Education, Sport and Health alumni
Moscow State University of Economics, Statistics, and Informatics alumni
Medalists at the 2000 Summer Olympics